The 2008 NASCAR Craftsman Truck Series was the fourteenth season of the Craftsman Truck Series, the third highest stock car racing series sanctioned by NASCAR in the United States. It was contested over twenty-five races, beginning with the Chevy Silverado HD 250 at Daytona International Speedway and ending with the Ford 200 at Homestead-Miami Speedway. Johnny Benson of Bill Davis Racing was crowned champion. The season was also the last under the Craftsman sponsorship banner until the 2023 season. Sears Holdings Corporation, the owners of the Craftsman brand name of tools, withdrew sponsorship at the end of the season. On October 23, NASCAR officials confirmed that Camping World would become the title sponsor beginning with the 2009 season.

2008 teams and drivers

Full-time teams

Part-time teams

Races

Chevy Silverado HD 250
The Chevy Silverado HD 250 was held February 15 at Daytona International Speedway. Erik Darnell won the pole. Anticipating another three wide finish such as the ones in 2003 and 2007, Darnell hoped to squash those hopes, and nearly did so by dominating the early portions of the race. During the early stages, multiple wrecks came about, including "The Big One" on lap 20, which was started when Brendan Gaughan made contact with an extremely tight Mike Skinner, forcing him up the racetrack and into the path of Matt Crafton, who also collected Ted Musgrave, Jon Wood, Chad Chaffin, and most notably P. J. Jones whose No. 63 truck caught fire trying to avoid the wreck, forcing a red flag. Only three laps later did the next wreck strike, with Joey Clanton getting loose and spinning, collecting outside polesitter Terry Cook, Mike Bliss, and ROTY contenders Colin Braun and Justin Marks. Darnell had the race in hand until green flag pitstops began at lap 84. Todd Bodine grabbed the lead from the dominant Darnell, who thought he had a loose wheel. While slowing to enter pit road, Marks was unaware that Darnell was pitting and the two made contact, ending Darnell's night. After the pit stop, Bodine would not look back, holding off a hard charging Kyle Busch and Johnny Benson for his first ever win at Daytona.

Top ten results:

Did not qualify: Brian Sockwell (#54).

NOTE: Todd Bodine suffered a 25-point penalty when an illegal part was found on his truck during pre-qualifying inspection.

San Bernardino County 200
The San Bernardino County 200 was held February 23 at the newly renamed Auto Club Speedway. As all of Friday's activities were cancelled due to rain, Truck qualifying and the race were both cancelled, with the race being pushed back to Saturday morning. Based on the 2007 owners points, defending champion Ron Hornaday Jr. was on pole. However, the race would mostly be dominated by Kyle Busch, coming out of a frustrating Speedweeks. Busch would dominate, leading the first 51 laps. However, Daytona winner Todd Bodine ran down Busch and passed him on the backstretch just after the halfway point. After the final round of green flag pit stops, Busch regained the lead by 3.5 seconds over Bodine and never looked back, cruising to his first Truck Series win of the season.

Top ten results:

Did not qualify: None, only 35 entries.

American Commercial Lines 200

The American Commercial Lines 200 was held on March 7 at Atlanta Motor Speedway. Defending series champion Ron Hornaday Jr. won the pole. Hornaday would also dominate the race on long runs, leading for 81 laps. However, the critical moment of the race was on lap 112 when Kyle Busch's crew chief, Richie Wauters brought his driver into the pits after a ten-minute rain delay on lap 111. The stop forced leader Hornaday to pit a lap later. Busch took the lead from Hornaday within 10 laps to go, and held of Hornaday over a four lap sprint to the finish to take his second consecutive victory.

Top ten results:

Did not qualify: None, only 32 entries.

Kroger 250
The Kroger 250 was held March 29 at Martinsville Speedway. Jack Sprague won the track record breaking pole. The race would instead be dominated by "Short Track Slayer" Dennis Setzer, whose team, Bobby Hamilton Racing-Virginia, had recently moved to the Martinsville area to be more competitive. This competitiveness showed when Setzer took the lead on lap 128 when debutant Brent Raymer spun in front of leader Kyle Busch. Setzer would lead the rest of the way thanks to nine more cautions. Although the race went on for an extra three laps, Setzer would hang on for his first win since he won Mansfield (also on fuel mileage) with the defunct Spears Motorsports. However, behind Setzer it was complete chaos. While Setzer was rounding turn 4 to take the win, Busch, in a desperate attempt to take second, Busch attempted to drive underneath Johnny Benson However, Busch's left side hit the apron, sending both Benson Jr. and Busch spinning to 25th and 26th-place finishes. The win was emotional for the whole team as it was their first win since Bobby Hamilton won at Mansfield in 2005.

Did not qualify: None, only 36 entries.

O'Reilly Auto Parts 250
The O'Reilly Auto Parts 250 was held on April 26 at Kansas Speedway. Ron Hornaday Jr. started from pole. For the first time this season, points leader Kyle Busch was absent in this race, due to a conflict between the finish of the Aaron's 312 and the start of the Truck race. With a new truck and the guidance of crew chief Rick Ren, Hornaday dominated the race, leading 136 of 167 laps en route to his first win of the season. Making the win even sweeter was the fact that it was a KHI 1–2 finish with new teammate Jack Sprague close behind. Rookie Colin Braun rounded out the "podium" although controversially as he was involved in incidents with veterans Sprague and Matt Crafton.

Did not qualify: None, only 36 entries.

North Carolina Education Lottery 200
The North Carolina Education Lottery 200 was held on May 16 at Lowe's Motor Speedway. Kyle Busch won the pole. Busch would dominate for 86 laps at the site of his first ever truck series win. On lap 104, Busch collided with defending champion Ron Hornaday Jr., sending both trucks into the turn 3 wall and out of contention to win. Late in the race with seven laps to go, Erik Darnell was leading the field to the green on a restart when his tires spun, taking him out of contention. As Johnny Benson moved by Darnell for the top spot, NASCAR penalized Benson Jr. for jumping the start. In the lead during the next restart would be Matt Crafton, followed by a resurgent Hornaday and Todd Bodine. On the subsequent restart, Bodine sent Hornaday spinning into turn one, handing second and third to Chad McCumbee and Brendan Gaughan, respectively. Despite a valiant run by McCumbee on the backstretch, Crafton would take home an upset victory, his first in 178 races and the first for ThorSport Racing in a decade (Terry Cook's first win at Flemington Speedway).

Did not qualify: Nick Tucker (#73), Wayne Edwards (#28).

Ohio 250
The Ohio 250 was held on May 24 at Mansfield Motorsports Park. Johnny Benson won the pole. As with most Mansfield races, the action was expected to be tight and dramatic, with fuel mileage playing out in the latter half. With the downsizing in fuel cells to 18 gallons, it was deemed mathematically impossible for any driver in the field to repeat Dennis Setzer's no stop victory the previous year. With a record 15 cautions, the best of the afternoon was saved for the last part of the race. David Starr and his Red Horse Racing team had dominated the day, leading 170 laps in total. However, in the final laps, Starr's seemingly inevitable victory would be done in. Rookie Donny Lia, who had started 28th, had worked his way through the field and to the rear tailgate of Starr's truck. On the final lap, Lia daringly pulled the bump and run on Starr exiting turn 2. The two drivers along with Todd Bodine made it three wide on the backstretch. Lia would gain the advantage heading into turn three and the 2007 Whelen Modified Tour champion would hang on to take the first ever win for both him and his upstart team, legendary road racing team TRG Motorsports, as well as the second consecutive first time winner for the 2008 season.

Did not qualify: None, only 36 entries.

AAA Insurance 200
The AAA Insurance 200 was held on May 30 at Dover International Speedway. Mike Skinner won the pole. Skinner would not lead for long as the dominant Kyle Busch would take the top spot and stay there for the first 96 laps. However, heavy smoke was billowing from Busch's No. 51 truck, forcing him to the garage with transmission troubles and knocking him out of contention. Taking over the top spot would be Todd Bodine, who would stay out on a lap 133 restart with Shane Sieg. Making only his sixth start in NASCAR competition and running on two tires, ex-Formula One driver Scott Speed lived up to his name and opened up a four-second lead on Ron Hornaday Jr. Although Speed's lead would be cut due to Bodine crashing on lap 170, he would hold off veterans Hornaday and Jack Sprague to become the third consecutive first time winner for the 2008 season. The other time this happened was in 1998, with Andy Houston (Loudon), Terry Cook (Flemington), and Jimmy Hensley (Music City)

Did not qualify: None, only 36 entries.

Sam's Town 400
The Sam's Town 400 was held June 6 at Texas Motor Speedway. Justin Marks won his first career pole. As the series was on a streak of three consecutive first time winners, many looked towards Chad McCumbee, who had nearly won the fall Texas race in '07, polesitter Marks, and Plano native Colin Braun. It was not just the young drivers seeking the win at Texas, but veterans as well, such as defending champion Ron Hornaday Jr., Mike Skinner, who started on the front row at Texas for his eighth consecutive start had never won, and Brendan Gaughan, who literally turned the track into his personal playground in both '02 and '03. Although Marks led early he would fall back to 8th before the first round of pit stops. As usual, Cup series points leader Kyle Busch would also be a factor in the race. Although Busch started in the back (Shane Sieg qualified the No. 51 truck while Busch was in Pocono, Pennsylvania and he also missed the drivers meeting.) he was able to work his way into the top 10 within 60 laps. However, Busch's fortunes would be undone as he had not had the proper seat time to adjust the truck. All the while, "Restart Master" Hornaday would lead a record 140 laps (breaking Greg Biffle's record of 119) and hold off Busch on a green-white-checkered to take his first win at Texas.

Did not qualify: None, only 35 entries.

Cool City Customs 200
The Cool City Customs 200 was held on June 14 at Michigan International Speedway. Mike Skinner won the pole. Skinner would only lead the opening lap before falling back and eventually finishing 8th. From then on, the race would be dominated by Todd Bodine who would lead for 39 laps. However, the final pit stop, it would be Erik Darnell taking the top spot, holding it for the final 25 circuits. However, a late caution came out with three to go, setting up a fast finish. On the last lap, Johnny Benson took the lead from Darnell in turn 3 and the two were side by side on the frontstretch. In the final 50 yards it appeared as though Benson Jr. would win by a nose, but Darnell surged at the last minute with a side draft and beat Benson to the line by less than 0.005 seconds, the second closest finish in Truck Series history. During the final lap, points leader Ron Hornaday Jr. was running fourth after starting in the back due to an engine change. In turn 2, Hornaday was spun by Kyle Busch into the infield, but no caution came out, handing Hornaday a 23rd-place finish and the loss of the points lead. After the race Hornaday and team owner Kevin Harvick confronted Busch on pit road.

Did not qualify: None, only 34 entries.

Camping World RV Sales 200
The Camping World RV Sales 200 was held June 20 at Milwaukee Mile. Johnny Benson took the pole and won the race.

Top ten results:

Did not qualify: None, only 36 entries.

O'Reilly 200 
The O'Reilly 200 was held June 28 at Memphis Motorsports Park. Johnny Benson took the pole but Ron Hornaday Jr. won the race.

Top ten results:

Did not qualify: None, only 35 entries.

Built Ford Tough 225
The Built Ford Tough 225 was held July 19 at Kentucky Speedway. Mike Skinner took the pole but Johnny Benson won the race.

Top ten results:

Did not qualify: Wayne Edwards (#28).

Power Stroke Diesel 200
The Power Stroke Diesel 200 was held July 25 at O'Reilly Raceway Park. Bobby East took his first Craftsman Truck Series pole but Johnny Benson won the race.

Top ten results:

Did not qualify: None, only 34 entries.

Toyota Tundra 200
The Toyota Tundra 200 was held August 9 at Nashville Superspeedway. Todd Bodine took the pole but Johnny Benson won the race.

Top ten results:

Did not qualify: None, only 34 entries.

NOTE: Todd Bodine suffered a 25-point penalty for an illegal modification to his truck found in post race inspection.

O'Reilly 200 (Bristol)
The O'Reilly 200 was held on August 20 at Bristol Motor Speedway. Scott Speed won the pole and would fall back and eventually finished 3rd.

Top ten results:

Did not qualify: Norm Benning (#57).

• Jimmie Johnson would make his lone career Truck Series start to date, driving the #81 Lowe's/Kobalt Tools Chevrolet Silverado for Randy Moss Motorsports. He would lead 28 laps and finish 34th after crashing on lap 102.

Camping World 200
The Camping World 200 was held September 6 at Gateway International Raceway. Dennis Setzer took the pole but Ron Hornaday Jr. won the race.

Top ten results:

Did not qualify: None, only 35 entries.

Camping World RV Rental 200

The Camping World RV Rental 200 was held on September 13 at New Hampshire Motor Speedway. Ron Hornaday Jr. won the race and there was a large post race scuffle after the race between the crews of Todd Bodine and David Starr.

Top ten results:

Did not qualify: None, only 33 entries.

Qwik Liner Las Vegas 350
The Qwik Liner Las Vegas 350 was held September 20 at Las Vegas Motor Speedway. Ron Hornaday Jr. won the pole. Hornaday would be passed by Mike Skinner after the opening lap. During a series of pit stops, points leader Johnny Benson decided to stay out, despite the fact his tires were old. He would lead for 26 laps before the right front tire went flat, sending Benson Jr. into the wall and ending his bid for the win. After pit stops following a caution by Dennis Setzer and Shane Sieg, Erik Darnell would take the lead stay there for 56 laps, leading the most. However, Mike Skinner chased down Darnell on the white flag lap and was side by side with him along the backstretch. Darnell side drafted Skinner to retake the lead coming out of turn 4 but Skinner hit Darnell's side, breaking the No. 99's momentum and taking Skinner to his first win of 2008.

Top ten results:

Did not qualify: None, only 31 entries.

Mountain Dew 250
The Mountain Dew 250 was held on October 4 at Talladega Superspeedway. Erik Darnell won the pole. The points race had tightened with Johnny Benson only a single point ahead of defending champion Ron Hornaday Jr. Like Daytona, Darnell dominated the race, leading 48 laps with teammates Colin Braun and John Wes Townley close behind. Townley would later be spun unintentionally by defending race winner Todd Bodine while on pit road at lap 50. Alabama native Rick Crawford earned a speeding penalty during the series of pit stops, ending his chances at a home state victory. After another series of green flag pit stops, John Andretti, Braun, Kyle Busch, and Brian Scott took turns leading until 14 to go when Busch, Hornaday, and Bodine all pulled away. With 1 to go Braun was pushed into the lead by T. J. Bell, but was later passed by Busch on the backstretch. However, Bodine pulled the "bump and run" on Busch, loosening him and eventually passing him for the win, with new points leader Hornaday in tow.

Top ten results:

Did not qualify: None, only 33 entries.

Kroger 200 
The Kroger 200 was held October 18 at Martinsville Speedway. Ron Hornaday Jr. took the pole but Johnny Benson won the race.

Top ten results:

Did not qualify: Tayler Malsam (#41), Robert Bruce (#73), Russ Dugger (#89), Craig Wood (#50).

E-Z-GO 200
The E-Z-GO 200 was held October 25 at Atlanta Motor Speedway. Ryan Newman won his first ever Craftsman Truck Series race in his first start.

Top ten results:

Did not qualify: None, only 33 entries.

Chevy Silverado 350K
The Chevy Silverado 350K was held October 31 at Texas Motor Speedway in Fort Worth, Texas. Rick Crawford won the pole. The sparks flew early on lap 2 as Travis Kvapil, attempting a three wide pass, pushed rookie Cale Gale into the left side of Crawford's truck. Gale's resultant spin forced T. J. Bell to hit his brakes, but Todd Bodine couldn't avoid Bell and tapped him up the track while also turning Jon Wood into the wall. Gale's car steered from the wall and hit Bell's rear quarter panel, sending him into the fence. At lap 51, spring Texas winner Ron Hornaday Jr. passed Kyle Busch for the lead. While Hornaday was pitting on lap 56, Jack Smith spun on the backstretch, pinning Hornaday a lap down. 10 laps later Hornaday would be in 16th thanks to a caution. Hornaday would charge to the lead, passing Kvapil on lap 108 and holding off Busch to sweep at Texas and cut Johnny Benson's point lead down to only six points.

Top ten results:

Did not qualify: None, only 34 entries.

Lucas Oil 150 (Phoenix)
The Lucas Oil 150 was held November 7 at Phoenix International Raceway. Ron Hornaday Jr. took the pole but Kevin Harvick won the race.

Top ten results:

Did not qualify: None, only 35 entries.

Ford 200
The Ford 200 was held November 14 at Homestead-Miami Speedway. Mike Skinner took the pole but Todd Bodine won the race.

Top ten results:

Did not qualify: Mike Harmon (#89).

Full Drivers' Championship

(key) Bold – Pole position awarded by time. Italics – Pole position set by owner's points. * – Most laps led.

See also

2008 NASCAR Sprint Cup Series
2008 NASCAR Nationwide Series
 2008 NASCAR Camping World East Series
 2008 NASCAR Camping World West Series
 2008 NASCAR Corona Series
 2008 NASCAR Canadian Tire Series

References

External links
 NASCAR official website 
 NASCAR Craftsman Truck Series Home Page 
Truck Series Standings and Statistics for 2008

NASCAR Truck Series seasons